Leandro Andrés De Muner (born 10 April 1983) is a retired Argentine professional footballer who played as a midfielder and football manager.

Career
Argentinos Juniors were a youth club of De Muner's. He began his senior career in 2004 with Primera B Nacional's Tigre, staying for two years whilst featuring twenty times. Stints with All Boys and Atlanta followed in Primera B Metropolitana, prior to the midfielder moving to Deportivo Morón in 2008. After trialling at Alavés in 2009, Argentine third tier side Los Andes signed De Muner in early 2010; which preceded him joining San Martín months later. He made his debut on 5 September against Atlético de Rafaela. After spending one-and-a-half seasons with Temperley, De Muner featured for Acassuso and ex-club San Martín in 2013.

On 22 January 2014, De Muner joined Primera C Metropolitana side Justo José de Urquiza. He was selected for fifteen fixtures in 2013–14 as the club finished twentieth. De Muner subsequently spent the 2014 and 2015 Torneo Federal A campaigns with Unión Aconquija, netting two goals across forty-seven appearances in all competitions in the process. January 2016 saw De Muner depart to join Mitre. He scored goals against Sportivo Belgrano, Chaco For Ever, Juventud Antoniana and Sarmiento as they won promotion to Primera B Nacional in 2017–18.

Coaching career
After retiring from football in 2021, it was confirmed in January 2022, that De Muner had returned to his former club, Mitre, as reserve team manager, as well as youth coordinator. On 29 March 2022, after Mitre-manager Arnaldo Sialle was fired, De Muner was appointed manager of the first team on interim basis. De Muner was in charge for two games (one draw and one defeat), before he was replaced by Pablo Ricchetti. There was no announcement as to whether De Muner continued at the club, which is why he seemed to be leaving Mitre at the time of the replacement.

Personal life
De Muner's cousin, Pablo, is a former professional footballer and current football manager.

Career statistics
.

Honours
Tigre
Primera B Metropolitana: 2004–05

References

External links

1983 births
Living people
Footballers from Buenos Aires
Argentine footballers
Association football midfielders
Primera B Metropolitana players
Primera Nacional players
Torneo Argentino A players
Primera C Metropolitana players
Torneo Federal A players
Club Atlético Tigre footballers
All Boys footballers
Club Atlético Atlanta footballers
Deportivo Morón footballers
Club Atlético Los Andes footballers
San Martín de Tucumán footballers
Club Atlético Temperley footballers
Club Atlético Acassuso footballers
Asociación Social y Deportiva Justo José de Urquiza players
Club Atlético Mitre footballers
Sportivo Desamparados footballers
Juventud Alianza players
Argentine football managers
Club Atlético Mitre managers